"So Much Trouble in the World" is a song by Bob Marley and the Wailers, which was released in 1979 off their album Survival released in the same year. The song peaked at number 56 in the UK charts.

It was written and performed by the legendary Jamaican musician Bob Marley, and was released on his 1979 album "Survival". The song is a powerful commentary on the state of the world, with lyrics that speak to the various problems and conflicts that exist, including poverty, inequality, war, and environmental degradation. Despite being released over 40 years ago, the song's message remains relevant today.

Music audio
A music audio for the song was uploaded in YouTube on October 10, 2020.

Charts

Reference

1979 songs
1979 singles
Bob Marley songs
Songs written by Bob Marley
Madness (band) songs